Iqra is a feminine given name that may refer to

Iqra Aziz (born 1997), Pakistani actress
Iqra Khalid (born 1985), Canadian politician
Iqra Quraishi, Indian social activist
Iqra Rasool (born 2000), Indian cricketer
Iqra Ahmed, fictional character from EastEnders

See also

Feminine given names